Putative splicing factor, arginine/serine-rich 14 is a protein that in humans is encoded by the SFRS14 gene.

References

Further reading

External links